Tyrrell Glen Hatton (born 14 October 1991) is an English professional golfer who plays on the European Tour and the PGA Tour. He has won six times on the European Tour; including four Rolex Series events. He also won the 2020 Arnold Palmer Invitational on the PGA Tour. Hatton played in the winning 2018 Ryder Cup team.

Amateur career
Hatton qualified for the 2010 Open Championship as an amateur.

Professional career
Prior to joining the Challenge Tour in 2012 Hatton mainly played on the PGA EuroPro Tour and the Jamega Pro Golf Tour and has won two events on each of these tours. His first professional win came at Woodcote Park Golf Club on the Jamega Tour He followed this up with a second win on the Jamega Tour at Caversham Heath. Hatton's was medalist at PGA EuroPro Tour's 2012 qualifying school at Frilford Heath Golf Club and he followed this with a second win at the Your Golf Travel Classic at Bovey Castle later in the same season. He won Rookie of the Year the same season.

Hatton played on the Challenge Tour in 2012 and 2013. His best finishes were a pair of T-2s at the Kazakhstan Open and The Foshan Open in 2013. He finished 10th on the 2013 Challenge Tour rankings to qualify for the 2014 European Tour.

In his rookie season on the European Tour, Hatton finished T-2 at the 2014 Joburg Open, a qualifying series event for the 2014 Open Championship at Hoylake; with ties for qualification broken by Official World Golf Ranking, as the lowest ranked player Hatton was the one to miss out. Later in the year, he finished in a tie for fourth place at the Aberdeen Asset Management Scottish Open, the final qualifying series event, to earn his place in The Open field.

On the 9 October 2016, Hatton secured his first victory on the European Tour as he cruised to the Alfred Dunhill Links Championship title at St Andrews. He finished on 23 under par, four shots clear of South African Richard Sterne and England's Ross Fisher. Hatton carded a final round six-under 66, having equalled the St Andrews Old Course record with a 62 in the third round.   The win took him inside the top 35 of the Official World Golf Ranking, from 53rd.

After a summer of struggles in 2017, Hatton found himself in contention at the British Masters – but a disappointing weekend saw him finish T8. His on-course temperament was called into question, with veteran European Tour pro Gary Evans telling him to 'grow up'. Hatton responded a week later at the successful defence of his Alfred Dunhill Links Championship title by saying: 'Nobody's perfect'. Hatton also won the next week, winning the Italian Open. At the Masters, he fell on the golf course and suffered a wrist injury that necessitated surgery in 2020.

In September 2018, Hatton qualified for the European team participating in the 2018 Ryder Cup. Hatton won one of his two fourball matches playing alongside Paul Casey, losing the other, and lost his singles match against Patrick Reed.

In November 2019, Hatton won the Turkish Airlines Open. Hatton finished the event at 20-under-par and then won a six-man playoff to claim the title and the first prize of US$2,000,000.

In March 2020, Hatton won the Arnold Palmer Invitational by one stroke over Marc Leishman for his first PGA Tour victory. In October, Hatton won the European Tour's flagship event, BMW PGA Championship at Wentworth. He became the second player to win three Rolex Series events, and the win lifted him into the top 10 of the world ranking for the first time.

Hatton regained winning ways in 2021 by securing a victory at the Abu Dhabi HSBC Championship. It was his fourth Rolex Series win.

In September 2021, Hatton played on the European team in the 2021 Ryder Cup at Whistling Straits in Kohler, Wisconsin. The U.S. team won 19–9 and Hatton went 1–2–1 and lost his Sunday singles match against Justin Thomas.

Professional wins (10)

PGA Tour wins (1)

European Tour wins (6)

 The BMW PGA Championship is also a Rolex Series tournament.

European Tour playoff record (1–0)

PGA EuroPro Tour wins (1)

Jamega Pro Golf Tour wins (2)

Results in major championships
Results not in chronological order in 2020.

CUT = missed the halfway cut
"T" = tied
NT = No tournament due to COVID-19 pandemic

Summary

 Most consecutive cuts made – 8 (2018 Masters – 2019 Open)
 Longest streak of top-10s – 2 (2016 Open – 2016 PGA)

Results in The Players Championship

CUT = missed the half-way cut
"T" indicates a tie for a place
C = Cancelled after the first round due to the COVID-19 pandemic

Results in World Golf Championships

1Cancelled due to COVID-19 pandemic

QF, R16, R32, R64 = Round in which player lost in match play
NT = No tournament
"T" = Tied
Note that the Championship and Invitational were discontinued from 2022.

Team appearances
Professional
 EurAsia Cup (representing Europe): 2018 (winners)
 Ryder Cup (representing Europe): 2018 (winners), 2021
 World Cup (representing England): 2018
 Hero Cup (representing Great Britain & Ireland): 2023

Personal life
Hatton is a supporter of Liverpool F.C.

See also
 2013 Challenge Tour graduates

References

External links
 
 
 
 

English male golfers
European Tour golfers
Ryder Cup competitors for Europe
Sportspeople from High Wycombe
People from Marlow, Buckinghamshire
1991 births
Living people